Below is the list of populated places in Ordu Province, Turkey by the districts. In the following lists first place in each list is the administrative center of the district

Ordu 
 Ordu
 Akçatepe, Ordu
 Akkise, Ordu
 Alembey, Ordu
 Alınca, Ordu
 Alisayvan, Ordu
 Altunyurt, Ordu
 Arpaköy, Ordu
 Artıklı, Ordu
 Ataköy, Ordu
 Aydınlık, Ordu
 Bahariye, Ordu
 Bayadı, Ordu
 Bayramlı, Ordu
 Boztepe, Ordu
 Burhanettinköy, Ordu
 Cumhuriyet, Ordu
 Çavuşlar, Ordu
 Dedeli, Ordu
 Delikkaya, Ordu
 Düzköy, Ordu
 Emen, Ordu
 Erenli, Ordu
 Eskipazar, Ordu
 Eyüplü, Ordu
 Gerce, Ordu
 Gökömer, Ordu
 Gümüşköy, Ordu
 Günören, Ordu
 Güzelyalı, Ordu
 Hacılar, Ordu
 Hatipli, Ordu
 Hürriyet, Ordu
 Işıklı, Ordu
 Karaağaç, Ordu
 Karacaömer, Ordu
 Karaoluk, Ordu
 Kayabaşı, Ordu
 Kayadibi, Ordu
 Kısacık, Ordu
 Kızılhisar, Ordu
 Kovancı, Ordu
 Kökenli, Ordu
 Kurtulmuş, Ordu
 Kuylu, Ordu
 Mubarek, Ordu
 Oğmaca, Ordu
 Orhaniye, Ordu
 Ortaköy, Ordu
 Osmaniye, Ordu
 Öceli, Ordu
 Örencik, Ordu
 Övündük, Ordu
 Pelitli, Ordu
 Sağırlı, Ordu
 Saraycık, Ordu
 Şenköy, Ordu
 Şenocak, Ordu
 Terzili, Ordu
 Teyneli, Ordu
 Tikence, Ordu
 Topluca, Ordu
 Uzunisa, Ordu
 Uzunmusa, Ordu
 Yağızlı, Ordu
 Yaraşlı, Ordu
 Yemişli, Ordu
 Yeşilköy, Ordu
 Yıldızlı, Ordu
 Yukarıtepe, Ordu
 Zafer, Ordu

Akkuş
 Akkuş
 Akpınar, Akkuş
 Ambargürgen, Akkuş
 Ceyhanlı, Akkuş
 Çamlıca, Akkuş
 Çavdar, Akkuş
 Çayıralan, Akkuş
 Çökek, Akkuş
 Çukurköy, Akkuş
 Dağyolu, Akkuş
 Damyeri, Akkuş
 Düğencili, Akkuş
 Esentepe, Akkuş
 Gedikli, Akkuş
 Gökçebayır, Akkuş
 Gürgenliyatak, Akkuş
 Haliluşağı, Akkuş
 Karaçal, Akkuş
 Kargı, Akkuş
 Kemikgeriş, Akkuş
 Ketendere, Akkuş
 Kızılelma, Akkuş
 Koçcuvaz, Akkuş
 Kurtboğaz, Akkuş
 Kuşçulu, Akkuş
 Külekçili, Akkuş
 Meyvalı, Akkuş
 Muratlı, Akkuş
 Ormancık, Akkuş
 Ortabölme, Akkuş
 Salman, Akkuş
 Seferli, Akkuş
 Şahinköy, Akkuş
 Tuzakköy, Akkuş
 Yeşilgüneycik, Akkuş
 Yeşilköy, Akkuş
 Yolbaşı, Akkuş
 Yukarıdüğencili, Akkuş

Aybastı
 Aybastı
 Alacalar, Aybastı
 Beştam, Aybastı
 Çakırlı, Aybastı
 Hisarcık, Aybastı
 Kayabaşı, Aybastı
 Pelitözü, Aybastı
 Sarıyar, Aybastı
 Sefalık, Aybastı
 Toygar, Aybastı
 Uzundere, Aybastı
 Zaferimilli, Aybastı

Çamaş
 Çamaş
 Budak, Çamaş
 Edirli, Çamaş
 Hisarbey, Çamaş
 Kocaman, Çamaş
 Saitler, Çamaş
 Söken, Çamaş

Çatalpınar
 Çatalpınar
 Akkaya, Çatalpınar
 Elmaköy, Çatalpınar
 Göller, Çatalpınar
 Gündoğdu, Çatalpınar
 Karahamza, Çatalpınar
 Karahasan, Çatalpınar
 Kayatepe, Çatalpınar
 Keçili, Çatalpınar
 Madenköy, Çatalpınar
 Ortaköy, Çatalpınar
 Sayacatürk, Çatalpınar
 Şirinköy, Çatalpınar

Çaybaşı
 Çaybaşı
 Akbaba, Çaybaşı
 Eğribel, Çaybaşı
 Göksu, Çaybaşı
 İçeribükü, Çaybaşı
 İlküvez, Çaybaşı
 Kapılı, Çaybaşı
 Köklük, Çaybaşı

Fatsa
 Fatsa
 Ahmetler, Fatsa
 Arpalık, Fatsa
 Aslancami, Fatsa
 Aşağıardıç, Fatsa
 Aşağıtepe, Fatsa
 Aşağıyavaş, Fatsa
 Bacanak, Fatsa
 Bağlarca, Fatsa
 Bahçeler, Fatsa
 Başköy, Fatsa
 Beyceli, Fatsa
 Bolaman, Fatsa
 Bozdağı, Fatsa
 Bucaklı, Fatsa
 Buhari, Fatsa
 Bülbül, Fatsa
 Büyükkoç, Fatsa
 Çömlekli, Fatsa
 Çötelü, Fatsa
 Demirci, Fatsa
 Dereyurt, Fatsa
 Duayeri, Fatsa
 Düğünlük, Fatsa
 Eskiordu, Fatsa
 Geyikçeli, Fatsa
 Gölköy, Fatsa
 Hatipli, Fatsa
 Hıdırbeyli, Fatsa
 Hoylu, Fatsa
 Ilıca, Fatsa
 İnönü, Fatsa
 İslamdağ, Fatsa
 Kabakdağı, Fatsa
 Kaleönü, Fatsa
 Karataş, Fatsa
 Kayaca, Fatsa
 Kılavuzömer, Fatsa
 Kılıçlı, Fatsa
 Kösebucağı, Fatsa
 Kulak, Fatsa
 Küçükkoç, Fatsa
 Mehmetakif, Fatsa
 Oluklu, Fatsa
 Örencik, Fatsa
 Salihli, Fatsa
 Saraytepe, Fatsa
 Sazcılar, Fatsa
 Sefaköy, Fatsa
 Sudere, Fatsa
 Tahtabaş, Fatsa
 Tayalı, Fatsa
 Tepecik, Fatsa
 Yalıköy, Fatsa
 Yapraklı, Fatsa
 Yassıbahçe, Fatsa
 Yassıtaş, Fatsa
 Yavaş, Fatsa
 Yenidoğan, Fatsa
 Yenikent, Fatsa
 Yeniyurt, Fatsa
 Yeşilköy, Fatsa
 Yeşiltepe, Fatsa
 Yukarıardıç, Fatsa
 Yukarıbahçeler, Fatsa
 Yukarıtepe, Fatsa
 Yusuflu, Fatsa

Gülyalı
 Gülyalı
 Ambarcılı, Gülyalı
 Ayrılık, Gülyalı
 Kestane, Gülyalı
 Mustafalı, Gülyalı
 Taşlıçay, Gülyalı
 Turnasuyu

Gürgentepe
 Gürgentepe
 Alaseher, Gürgentepe
 Bahtiyarlar, Gürgentepe
 Tikenlice, Gürgentepe
 Eskiköy, Gürgentepe
 Gülbelen, Gürgentepe
 Gültepe, Gürgentepe
 Hasancık, Gürgentepe
 Işıktepe, Gürgentepe
 Şirinköy, Gürgentepe
 Tepeköy, Gürgentepe
 Tuzla, Gürgentepe

Gölköy
 Gölköy
 Ahmetli, Gölköy
 Akçalı, Gölköy
 Alanyurt, Gölköy
 Aydoğan, Gölköy
 Bayıralan, Gölköy
 Bulut, Gölköy
 Cihadiye, Gölköy
 Çatak, Gölköy
 Çetilli, Gölköy
 Damarlı, Gölköy
 Direkli, Gölköy
 Düzyayla, Gölköy
 Emirler, Gölköy
 Güzelyayla, Gölköy
 Güzelyurt, Gölköy
 Haruniye, Gölköy
 Hürriyet, Gölköy
 İçyaka, Gölköy
 Kale, Gölköy
 Karahasan, Gölköy
 Konak, Gölköy
 Kozören, Gölköy
 Özlü, Gölköy
 Süleymaniye, Gölköy
 Yuvapınar, Gölköy

İkizce
 İkizce
 Derebaşı, İkizce
 Devecik, İkizce
 Dumantepe, İkizce
 Düzmeşe, İkizce
 Esentepe, İkizce
 Kaynartaş, İkizce
 Kervansaray, İkizce
 Kiraztepe, İkizce
 Özpınar, İkizce
 Şenbolluk, İkizce
 Yoğunoluk, İkizce

Kabadüz
 Kabadüz
 Akgüney, Kabadüz
 Derinçay, Kabadüz
 Dişkaya, Kabadüz
 Esenyurt, Kabadüz
 Gelinkaya, Kabadüz
 Gümüşdere, Kabadüz
 Gülpınar, Kabadüz
 Harami, Kabadüz
 Kirazdere, Kabadüz
 Özlükent, Kabadüz
 Yeşilada, Kabadüz
 Yokuşdibi, Kabadüz

Kabataş
 Kabataş
 Alankent, Kabataş
 Beylerli, Kabataş
 Kuzköy, Kabataş

Korgan
 Korgan
 Aşağıkozpınar, Korgan
 Belalan, Korgan
 Beypınarı, Korgan
 Büyükakçakese, Korgan
 Çamlı, Korgan
 Çayırkent, Korgan
 Çiftlik, Korgan
 Çitlice, Korgan
 Durali, Korgan
 Karakışla, Korgan
 Koçcuğaz, Korgan
 Soğukpınar, Korgan
 Tatarcık, Korgan
 Tepealan, Korgan
 Terzili, Korgan
 Yeniköy, Korgan
 Yeşilalan, Korgan
 Yeşildere, Korgan
 Yeşilyurt, Korgan
 Yukarıkozpınar, Korgan

Kumru
 Kumru
 Ağcaalantürk, Kumru
 Akçadere, Kumru
 Avdullu, Kumru
 Balı, Kumru
 Ballık, Kumru
 Çatılı, Kumru
 Derbent, Kumru
 Divanıtürk, Kumru
 Duman, Kumru
 Ergentürk, Kumru
 Esence, Kumru
 Eskiçokdeğirmen, Kumru
 Fizme, Kumru
 Gökçeli, Kumru
 Güneycik, Kumru
 Karaağaç, Kumru
 Karacalar, Kumru
 Kayabaşı, Kumru
 Konaklı, Kumru
 Kovancılı, Kumru
 Küçükakçakese, Kumru
 Ortaçokdeğirmen, Kumru
 Şenyurt, Kumru
 Tekkeköy, Kumru
 Yalnızdam, Kumru
 Yemişken, Kumru
 Yeniakçaalan, Kumru
 Yenidivan, Kumru
 Yeniergen, Kumru
 Yukarıdamlalı, Kumru

Mesudiye
 Mesudiye
 Abdili, Mesudiye
 Alan, Mesudiye
 Arıcılar, Mesudiye
 Arıkmusa, Mesudiye
 Armutkolu, Mesudiye
 Arpaalan, Mesudiye
 Aşağıgökçe, Mesudiye
 Aşıklı, Mesudiye
 Balıklı, Mesudiye
 Bayırköy, Mesudiye
 Bayraklı, Mesudiye
 Beşbıyık, Mesudiye
 Beyağaç, Mesudiye
 Beyseki, Mesudiye
 Birebir, Mesudiye
 Celal, Mesudiye
 Çaltepe, Mesudiye
 Çardaklı, Mesudiye
 Çavdar, Mesudiye
 Çerçi, Mesudiye
 Çitliksarıca, Mesudiye
 Çukuralan, Mesudiye
 Darıcabaşı, Mesudiye
 Dayılı, Mesudiye
 Derebaşı, Mesudiye
 Doğançam, Mesudiye
 Dursunlu, Mesudiye
 Erikköy, Mesudiye
 Esatlı, Mesudiye
 Göçbeyi, Mesudiye
 Gülpınar, Mesudiye
 Güneyce, Mesudiye
 Güvenli, Mesudiye
 Güzelce, Mesudiye
 Güzle, Mesudiye
 Hamzalı, Mesudiye
 Herközü, Mesudiye
 Ilışar, Mesudiye
 Kale, Mesudiye
 Karabayır, Mesudiye
 Karacaören, Mesudiye
 Kavaklıdere, Mesudiye
 Kışlacık, Mesudiye
 Konacık, Mesudiye
 Mahmudiye, Mesudiye
 Musalı, Mesudiye
 Pınarlı, Mesudiye
 Sarıca, Mesudiye
 Sarıyayla, Mesudiye
 Topçam, Mesudiye
 Türkköyü, Mesudiye
 Üçyol, Mesudiye
 Yağmurlar, Mesudiye
 Yardere, Mesudiye
 Yavşan, Mesudiye
 Yeşilce, Mesudiye
 Yeşilçit, Mesudiye
 Yeveli, Mesudiye
 Yukarıgökçe, Mesudiye
 Yuvalı, Mesudiye

Perşembe
 Perşembe
 Alınca, Perşembe
 Anaç, Perşembe
 Aziziye, Perşembe
 Bekirli, Perşembe
 Beyli, Perşembe
 Boğazcık, Perşembe
 Bolatlı, Perşembe
 Çamarası, Perşembe
 Çaytepe, Perşembe
 Çerli, Perşembe
 Doğan, Perşembe
 Efirli, Perşembe
 Ekinciler, Perşembe
 Gündoğdu, Perşembe
 Güzelyurt, Perşembe
 Hacılar, Perşembe
 İmeçli, Perşembe
 İstanbulboğazı, Perşembe
 Kazancılı, Perşembe
 Kırlı, Perşembe
 Kovanlı, Perşembe
 Kurtuluş, Perşembe
 Kutluca, Perşembe
 Kuyluca, Perşembe
 Medreseönü, Perşembe
 Mersin, Perşembe
 Neneli, Perşembe
 Okçulu, Perşembe
 Ortatepe, Perşembe
 Ramazan, Perşembe
 Saray, Perşembe
 Selimiye, Perşembe
 Sırakovancı, Perşembe
 Soğukpınar, Perşembe
 Şenyurt, Perşembe
 Tarlacık, Perşembe
 Tepecik, Perşembe
 Tepeköy, Perşembe
 Töngeldüzü, Perşembe
 Yarlı, Perşembe
 Yazlık, Perşembe
 Yeniköy, Perşembe
 Yeniöz, Perşembe
 Yeşilköy, Perşembe
 Yumrutaş, Perşembe

Ulubey
 Ulubey
 Akoluk, Ulubey
 Akpınar, Ulubey
 Aydınlar, Ulubey
 Başçardak, Ulubey
 Belenyurt, Ulubey
 Cevizlik, Ulubey
 Çağlayan, Ulubey
 Çubuklu, Ulubey
 Doğlu, Ulubey
 Durak, Ulubey
 Elmaçukur, Ulubey
 Eymür, Ulubey
 Fındıklı, Ulubey
 Güvenköy, Ulubey
 Güvenyurt, Ulubey
 Güzelyurt, Ulubey
 Hocaoğlu, Ulubey
 Kadıncık, Ulubey
 Kalıcak, Ulubey
 Kardeşler, Ulubey
 Kıranyağmur, Ulubey
 Kirazlık, Ulubey
 Koşaca, Ulubey
 Kumanlar, Ulubey
 Kumrulu, Ulubey
 Ohtamış, Ulubey
 Oyumgürgen, Ulubey
 Ören, Ulubey
 Refahiye, Ulubey
 Şahinkaya, Ulubey
 Şekeroluk, Ulubey
 Şıhlar, Ulubey
 Uzunmahmut, Ulubey
 Yenisayaca, Ulubey
 Yukarıkızılen, Ulubey

Ünye
 Ünye
 Ağıdere, Ünye
 Ataköy, Ünye
 Aydıntepe, Ünye
 Başköy, Ünye
 Beylerce, Ünye
 Cevizdere, Ünye
 Çakmak, Ünye
 Çatak, Ünye
 Çatalpınar, Ünye
 Çataltepe, Ünye
 Çınarcık, Ünye
 Çiğdem, Ünye
 Denizbükü, Ünye
 Dereköy, Ünye
 Dizdar, Ünye
 Düzköy, Ünye
 Düzsaylan, Ünye
 Elmalık, Ünye
 Erenyurt, Ünye
 Esenkale, Ünye
 Eskikızılcakese, Ünye
 Fatih, Ünye
 Göbü, Ünye
 Gölcüğez, Ünye
 Günpınarı, Ünye
 Güzelkale, Ünye
 Güzelyalı, Ünye
 Hanyanı, Ünye
 Hızabaşıgünlük, Ünye
 Hızarbaşıkumarlı, Ünye
 İnkur, Ünye
 Kadılar, Ünye
 Kale, Ünye
 Kaledibi, Ünye
 Keş, Ünye
 Killik, Ünye
 Kocuklu, Ünye
 Kuşçulu, Ünye
 Kuşdoğan, Ünye
 Nadirli, Ünye
 Nurettin, Ünye
 Ortaköy, Ünye
 Pelitliyatak, Ünye
 Pınarbaşı, Ünye
 Sahilköy, Ünye
 Saraycık, Ünye
 Sarıhalil, Ünye
 Saylan, Ünye
 Sofutepesi, Ünye
 Şenyurt, Ünye
 Taflancık, Ünye
 Taşça, Ünye
 Tekkiraz, Ünye
 Tepeköy, Ünye
 Uğurlu, Ünye
 Üçpınar, Ünye
 Yavı, Ünye
 Yaycı, Ünye
 Yaylalı, Ünye
 Yazkonağı, Ünye
 Yenikent, Ünye
 Yenikızılcakese, Ünye
 Yeniköy, Ünye
 Yeşilada, Ünye
 Yeşilkent, Ünye
 Yiğitler, Ünye
 Yüceler, Ünye

Recent development

According to Law act no 6447, all Turkish provinces with a population more than 750 000, were renamed as metropolitan municipality. Furthermore, the central district was renamed Altınordu. All districts in those provinces became second level municipalities and all villages in those districts  were renamed as a neighborhoods . Thus the villages listed above are officially neighborhoods of Ordu.

References

Ordu Province
List